Conasprella ximenes is a species of sea snail, a marine gastropod mollusk in the family Conidae, the cone snails and their allies.

Like all species within the genus Conasprella, these conesnails are predatory and venomous. They are capable of "stinging" humans, therefore live ones should be handled carefully or not at all.

Description
The size of the shell varies between 20 mm and 61 mm.

Distribution
This marine species occurs from the Gulf of California, Western Mexico to Peru; and off the Galápagos Islands

References

  Puillandre N., Duda T.F., Meyer C., Olivera B.M. & Bouchet P. (2015). One, four or 100 genera? A new classification of the cone snails. Journal of Molluscan Studies. 81: 1–23

External links
 The Conus Biodiversity website
 Cone Shells – Knights of the Sea

Gallery

ximenes
Gastropods described in 1839
Taxa named by John Edward Gray